The 1992–93 Evansville Purple Aces men's basketball team represented the University of Evansville in the 1992–93 NCAA Division I men's basketball season. Their head coach was Jim Crews and they played their home games at Roberts Municipal Stadium as members of the Midwestern Collegiate Conference. After finishing in a tie for the MCC regular season championship, the Purple Aces won the MCC tournament to receive an automatic bid to the 1993 NCAA tournament. They were defeated by Florida State in the opening round and finished 23–7 (12–2 MCC).

Roster

Schedule

|-
!colspan=9 style=| Regular season

|-
!colspan=9 style=| MCC tournament

|-
!colspan=9 style=| NCAA tournament

Rankings

References

Evansville Purple Aces
Evansville Purple Aces men's basketball seasons
Evansville
Evans
Evans